Anniversary! is a live album by saxophonist Stan Getz which was recorded at the Jazzhus Montmartre in 1987 and released on the EmArcy label in 1989.

Reception

The Allmusic review by Scott Yanow said "This enjoyable set (mostly lengthy versions of standards) finds the veteran tenor still very much in his prime".

Track listing
 "El Cahon" (Johnny Mandel) - 13:18
 "I Can't Get Started" (Vernon Duke, Ira Gershwin) - 11:27
 "Stella by Starlight" (Victor Young, Ned Washington) - 12:33 	
 "Stan's Blues" (Gigi Gryce) - 10:22
 "I Thought About You" (Jimmy Van Heusen, Johnny Mercer) - 8:20 Bonus track on CD
 "What Is This Thing Called Love?" (Cole Porter) - 9:43 Bonus track on CD
 "Blood Count" (Billy Strayhorn) - 4:02 Bonus track on CD

Personnel 
Stan Getz - tenor saxophone 
Kenny Barron - piano
Rufus Reid - bass
Victor Lewis - drums

References 

1989 live albums
Stan Getz live albums
EmArcy Records live albums
Albums recorded at Jazzhus Montmartre